Thomas Monroe (September 26, 1902-April 24, 1960) was an American screenwriter who was nominated twice for the Academy Award for Best Story.

Life
Between 1941 and 1958, Monroe wrote the templates and scripts for only five films and television series. He was nominated for the Academy Award for Best Story for his first work, along with Billy Wilder, at the 14th Academy Awards in 1942 for the film, Ball of Fire. His second Oscar nomination for best story was for The Affairs of Susan, co-written by László Görög. He died in Sawtelle, California.

The screenplay to Ball of Fire was also the basis for the Turkish film Ateş Gibi Kadın (1965, starring Tanju Gürsu, Leyla Sayar and Zafer Önen).

Filmography 
 Ball of Fire (1941)
 The Affairs of Susan (1945)
 A Song Is Born (1948)
 At This Moment (1954 short)
 The Texan (1958, for television)

References

External links 
 

American male screenwriters
1902 births
1960 deaths
20th-century American male writers
20th-century American screenwriters